The Nissan 350Z (known as Nissan Fairlady Z (Z33) in Japan) is a two-door, two-seater sports car that was manufactured by Nissan Motor Corporation from 2002 until 2009 and marks the fifth generation of Nissan's Z-car line. The 350Z entered production in 2002 and was sold and marketed as a 2003 model from August 2002. The first year there was only a coupe, as the roadster did not debut until the following year. Initially, the coupe came in Base, Enthusiast, Performance, Touring and Track versions, while the Roadster was limited to Enthusiast and Touring trim levels. The Track trim came with lightweight wheels and Brembo brakes, but its suspension tuning was the same as all other coupes. The Nissan 350Z was succeeded by the 370Z for the 2009 model year.

Background
After the Nissan 300ZX was withdrawn from the U.S. market in 1996, Nissan initially tried to keep the Z name alive by re-creating the 240Z the following year. The car was conceived by Nissan's North American design team in their free time, and the concept was introduced in a four state Road Show in July 1998 to various car media, dealers, and employees. Yutaka Katayama, regarded as the "Father of the Z" unveiled the Z concept sketch to the public when he received a motor industry award. The design, representing a modern vision of the 240Z, did not please the original 240Z designer Yoshihiko Matsuo, who compared it to the Bluebird and Leopard.

The 240Z concept was produced for the Detroit Motor Show during the following August and September. Nissan was unhappy with the first design as they felt the original  2.4 L KA24DE engine that was going to be assigned made the car feel underpowered, they also felt the car was considered too "retro" or too "backward" resembling a futuristic 240Z; hence, a redesign was commissioned. During a press conference in February 2000, president Carlos Ghosn announced plans to produce the car as he felt the new model would help to assist the company's recovery.

The Z Concept was unveiled in Detroit Motor Show two years later, which was similar in body shape but with a new front end. The car then underwent a minor redesign and was eventually assigned the 3.5 L VQ35DE engine, hence becoming known as the 350Z.

Concept Models

240Z concept (1999)

Nissan unveiled the 240Z concept car at the 1999 North American International Auto Show, then later at the Los Angeles Auto Expo. The concept was based primarily on a design sketch by Manny Baker of Nissan's California design studio. In a reference to the original, it was a bright orange two-seater with swept-back styling. It was thought a less than worthy successor to the line. The designers used an original 240Z to provide inspiration and the concept was created in only 12 weeks. Automotive critics described "it would be cool but get a new model." This design served the intended purpose of creating interest, in the public and the corporation, for a new Z car.

Design and layout
The 350Z is a front-engine, rear-wheel-drive, two-door, two-seat sports car designed by Diane Allen, part of a design team led by Ajay Panchal of Nissan Design America in San Diego, California in 2000. This program was inspired by the successful reception to the 1998 240Z concept model.

The vehicle has the long-hood short-deck design common to the Z-Car family. External design highlights include: sloping fastback style arched roof line, unique brushed aluminum door handles, high waistline, and bulging fenders that are pushed out to the corners of the vehicle.

The Interior design has brushed aluminum accents. The main gauge pod is mounted directly to the steering column allowing its movement to coincide with steering wheel adjustments. Additional gauges are mounted in a center triple gauge cluster (similar to the 240Z/260Z/280Z). Touring models are equipped with the Bose sound system get a six CD changer and 8-inch Bose subwoofer mounted behind the driver's seat. The 350Z's interior does not have a conventional glove box, but has storage compartments located behind and between the two seats.

Models

Released on July 2002 in Japan at reorganized Nissan Japanese dealerships called Nissan Blue Stage, and August 20, 2002 in the U.S., the 350Z coupé was available in 5 trim packages: '350Z' (Base), 'Enthusiast', 'Performance', 'Touring', and 'Track' editions. In Europe, only the 'Track' trim was available, although it was badged and marketed as '350Z'.  The Base model did not include a VLSD or Traction Control and was only available with cloth seats.  It did not include cruise control, nor power or heated seats.  The Enthusiast model came with traction control, a VLSD, and cruise control.  The Performance model came with larger 18-inch wheels, front air dam, rear spoiler, optional Brembo brakes, and VDC instead of Traction Control. Touring was made more of the luxury model.  It had power, leather, heated seats, VDC, a VLSD, xenon headlamps, optional Brembo brakes, 18-inch wheels, and optional GPS Navigation.  The Track model included Brembo brakes, front air dam, rear spoiler, traction control, cloth seats, 18-inch wheels, VLSD, and optional GPS Navigation.

In 2004 Nissan introduced the 350Z Roadster with an electrically retractable soft-top roof. In the U.S. market the car was available in two trim packages (Enthusiast and Touring), while in Europe, the same versions as the coupé were offered. Nissan added the Grand Touring (GT) trim to the Roadster trim packages for 2005.

In 2005 Nissan launched the 35th Anniversary edition, with a revised exterior and interior (see Special Editions below). Early 2005 model-year 35th anniversary edition models were equipped with the original VQ35DE engine with 287HP/274TQ and an automatic transmission. In January 2005, Nissan introduced the 35th Anniversary 6-speed manual models and Track models (mid-year introduction), which included the updated VQ35DE 300HP/260TQ 'Rev-up' engine and new updated CD009 manual transmission as well as minor changes to suspension tuning and parts.

For the 2006 model year, the 350Z received changes for its mid-cycle facelift. The VQ35DE 300HP/260TQ 'Rev-up' engine that was introduced mid-year 2005 on the Track and 35th Anniversary Edition with 6-speed manual transmission models was offered for every trim level that had a manual transmission option. Additions included bi-xenon projectors, a revised front fascia, new LED rear lights, changes to the interior trim and speed sensitive steering. Trim levels above the basic enthusiast package received a brake system upgrade including a larger brake booster, front dual piston calipers and larger diameter brake disks. Touring and Grand Touring models had radio-steering controls standard, MP3 CD compatibility, and Satellite Radio became an available option.

For the 2007 model year, the 350Z was again moderately revised. The VQ35DE V6 was replaced with a new VQ35HR V6. The VQ35HR had a raised redline to 7500 rpm and more torque across the rpm range. The hood was redesigned with a bulge reminiscent of the original 240Z to accommodate the raised deck height of the new VQ35HR. In the U.S., trim levels were narrowed down to 350Z (base), Enthusiast, Touring, Grand Touring and NISMO, while in Europe the same trim levels remained. Bluetooth was added for the 2007 model year.

Special Editions

Fairlady Z Type E (2004)
A total of 5 units, called the Type E, were produced in Japan for homologation requirements to compete in the Super GT series. It has a longer nose and rear overhang, as well as several add-ons for aerodynamic purposes.

350Z 35th Anniversary Edition (2005)

To commemorate the 35th anniversary of the debut of the Datsun 240Z, Nissan released a tuned version of the 350Z coupé. The 35th Anniversary Z was exhibited at the Specialty Equipment Marketing Association (SEMA) Show in Las Vegas on November 2, followed by the Miami Auto Show in early November. It went on sale in January 2005.

The 35th Anniversary Edition includes an updated VQ35DE 300 hp (224.99 kW) V6 engine for the six-speed manual transmission model. Other equipment (standard on six-speed manual-equipped versions) includes 18-inch (460 mm) cast aluminum-alloy wheels, front spoilers, Brembo brakes and special Z badging. The car was available in a special "Ultra Yellow" and "Pearl Blue" colors. The interior was also available with a black set configuration. Also included was a Bose 6-speaker premium sound system. A version of the 35th Anniversary Edition with a Gran Turismo 4 video game tie-in was also made.

350Z GT-S Concept
During the 2006 Goodwood Festival of Speed, Nissan Technical Centre Europe (NTCE) unveiled the 350Z GT-S Concept. The car also had new body kit for more cooling and downforce and wider 245 and 265/40/18 tires. The car was tested by automotive journalists, but none were marketed.

2008 Tokyo Auto Salon concepts (2008)
The Nissan Fairlady Z Type F, XANAVI NISMO Z (SUPER GT 2007 GT500 Class), ENDLESS ADVAN Z (series winner of the Japan's SUPER TAIKYU 2007 endurance series) and Fairlady Z Version NISMO Type 380RS were all unveiled at the 2008 Tokyo Auto Salon.

Fairlady Z Type F (2008-)
The Fairlady Z Type F is a version of the Nissan Fairlady Z coupe and roadster for the Japanese market with:

Choice of 6 body colors (Premium Blaze red (3 coat color), Premium Sunshine yellow (3 coat pearl), Premium Mystic maroon (Multiflex color), Blade silver metallic, Diamond black pearl, White pearl (3 coat pearl))
Exclusive red heated leather seats, red leather wrapped steering wheel, shift knob, parking brake lever, door trim and arm rest stage, aluminum door kickplates, RAYS forged aluminum wheels, power seats (slide, reclining), BOSE audio system, Brembo Brakes, . Buyers with Premium blaze red, Premium sunshine yellow, Premium mystic maroon color models (100 units each) before March 31, 2008 also received Fairlady Z original key holders.

The vehicles went on sale on January 10, 2008.

NISMO Editions
Nissan's performance tuning division, NISMO, began producing modified versions of the 350Z shortly after its introduction.

NISMO R-Tune (2004)
The R-Tune was a kit sold directly to customers with modifications including new headers, cams, pulleys. The R-Tune voids the Nissan factory warranty, but gains significant horsepower, intended for track racers.

NISMO S-Tune GT (2005)

The S-Tune GT was released by NISMO to celebrate its success in the Super GT series. The S-Tune GT had revised long nose bodywork as in the Type-E, a modified version of the VQ35DE engine called the S1 which featured more power (300 PS / 221 kW / 296 hp) and a higher redline (7,200 rpm), as well as a sportier NISMO suspension.

20 were produced each month in Japan. Although Nissan did not officially sell S-Tune in UK, Nissan Motor (GB) Ltd. imported 1 S-Tune GT to UK.

NISMO 350Z (2007–2008)

The NISMO edition of the Nissan 350Z Coupé debuted at the New York International Auto Show on April 4, 2007. This version had the same engine as the regular 350Z (VQ35HR), but was only available with a 6-speed manual transmission and a Viscous Limited-Slip Differential (VLSD), Traction Control System (TCS) and a NISMO aerodynamics package based on the Super GT championship car, which included an aggressive front fascia with chin spoiler, side skirts, an extended rear fascia with an underbody diffuser and a rear wing. The vehicle also featured NISMO-tuned independent multi-link suspension developed by Yamaha, Brembo brakes with four-piston front and two-piston rear calipers (with  front and  rear rotors) and NISMO-branded gunmetal grey RAYS forged alloy wheels and a NISMO-branded tuned exhaust. Yamaha also included front and rear dampeners to help with stability of the chassis.

The conversion process for the Nismo 350Z began with a limited number of chassis being pulled from the assembly line to be sent to Nissan-tuner Autech to have structural seams hand-welded for greater body rigidity. This process made the Nismo 350Z a more capable track car than the other trim levels available at the time.

The NISMO 350Z went on sale in the USA in July 2007 at Nissan dealers. 1607 were produced for the 2007 and 2008 model years, and it was assumed that if there was a greater demand, more would be produced, limited to 10% of all 350Z sales. The NISMO model 350Z had a manufacturer's suggested retail price of $38,070 for the 2007 model year.

NISMO Type 380RS (2007)
Released as the road version for Japanese market of the Type 380RS-Competition race car, the Type 380RS includes a detuned version of the 380RS-C race engine, rated at 257 kW (350 PS/348 hp) at 7200 rpm and 397 N·m (40.5 kgf·m/293 lbf·ft) of torque at 4,800 rpm. Brembo disc brakes are fitted, Front and rear dampers from Yamaha and forged RAYS alloy wheels.

NISMO Type 380RS is priced 5.397 million (5.14 million+tax) yen ($38695 USD). Only 300 units were produced from 2007 through to 2008.

NISMO Type 380RS-Competition
The NISMO Type 380RS-Competition is the race car on which NISMO Type 380RS is based. The 3,798 cc engine (VQ38HR) is rated at 294 kW (400 PS) at 7500 rpm and 421 N m (43 kgf m) of torque at 5,200 rpm. This in turn is based on the GT 500 race car that Nissan enters into the Super GT championship.

According to Nissan, the race car cost 26.25 million yen.

Police version
A NISMO version of the Fairlady Z was also used by the Tochigi Prefecture police force.

Motorsport

Grand Am
Since its introduction in 2002, it did not take long for drivers and teams to enter a  350Z for competition when B.J. Zacharias and Michiel Schuitemaker of Schuitemaker Motorsports helped the car to make its début in the Grand-Am Cup Series at the start of the 2003 season. They have taken a few podium finishes with Unitech Racing who is also the other team to field a Z33, but effort was proved to be successful under the name of Geddings Racing scoring wins along with the other current Grand-Am entrant East Competition Promotorsport. The Grand-Am Cup car has also been used in the new FIA GT4 European Cup. Schumacher Motorsports with drivers Michael Schumacher and BJ Zacharias won 3rd place in the '03 Grand-Am Cup season. The following year, they improved and finished in 2nd place. After winning 3rd overall in the '03 season, Nissan had Wright Tuning build a new 350Z race car for the '04 season. This car differed from the '03 car in that it was completely stripped and seam welded. The cage was lighter and stiffer by using different diameter tubing where possible. The car used a Menard's built engine with a Pectel engine management system. The '04 chassis proved to be the most successful chassis to run in Grand-Am to date. The '03 chassis was sold to a French team with Edouardo Atkatlan as the driver. It still competes in the European "Fun Races" today, winning 2nd place in the inaugural '07 race in Madrid, Spain.

JGTC/Super GT
The 350Z replaced the Skyline GT-R as the car for Nissan's factory and customer teams in the Super GT's GT 500 class. The cars used are heavily modified and had a longer nose and tail (requiring the production of the Type-E homologation special), carbon fiber bodywork, and a tube chassis. In 2004, NISMO won the GT500 championship. Until the 2007 season, the car was powered by a VQ30DETT V6, then a new 4.5L V8 powerplant was developed. The 350Z, with slightly more pedestrian modifications also competed in the GT300 class, having started there even before the Skyline GT-Rs were replaced, by teams such as Endless Sports and Mola. In 2003 Hasemi Sports won the GT300 championship with the 350Z. In the 2008 season, the 350Zs were all replaced by Nissan GT-Rs in the GT500 class, but they continued to be used in the GT300 class as the GT-Rs exceed the class's horsepower limits. Two 350Zs competed in the series and MOLA won both the Drivers' and Teams' championships in the GT300 class.

Super Taikyu
The Z33 also appears in the Japan's Super Taikyu series, entered by C-West Labs.

British GT Championship
The British GT Championship also fielded a privateer 350Z which competed in the series until 2006.

SCCA
The 350Z is a popular choice for amateurs and professionals competing in SCCA events. T.C Kline achieved third place in the 2003 Touring 2 category in one of three Z33s that qualified to the SCCA T-2 runoffs that year.  In the SCCA GT2 class, Jim Goughary took the title in the car's debut season.

The car has also seen success in SCCA solo events. In 2006, Carter Thompson's 350Z lost the SCCA National Championship by 0.1 second over two days of competition. The 350Z has achieved a high level of success at the National Solo Championships since 2006. Although production of the 350Z was discontinued in 2009, the car continues to compete in local and national SCCA events. As recently as 2015, 350Z solo drivers Jeff Stuart and Bryan Heitkotter were rated as the top two SCCA drivers competing in national autocross.

NASA
In 2012, NASA  (National Auto Sport Association), created a class of racing specifically for the 350Z. The "Spec Z" class includes all trim levels of the popular 2003-2008 Nissan 350Z in a single class focused on close competition, parity and cost containment that will showcase driving ability and car setup skills. The road racing series is backed by Nissan Motorsports and BFG Tires. The 2012 class rules were in their infant stage, but solidified by mid-2012.

Drifting

The 350Z is a popular platform for import events and drifting, where in the latter, drivers including Ryuji Miki, Youichi Imamura, Tyler McQuarrie and Tanner Foust have used them with success in the D1 Grand Prix and Formula D series. During the 2006 D1 Grand Prix exhibition event at the Las Vegas Motor Speedway, Tanner Foust, driving a 350Z, became the first competitor to achieve a perfect score of 100. Two Z33s competed in the non-Japanese domestic D1 Grand Prix spin-off series, D1 Great Britain. In the 2007 season, both SVA Imports and Sumo Power competed using 350Zs in the European Drift Championship. In Formula D, Foust was awarded the runner-up spot in Round 1. In Round 2, Chris Forsberg scored a maiden victory in his 350Z Roadster equipped with a VK56DE from a Nissan Titan. Forsberg's win for the 350Z was followed-up by Youichi Imamura's win during the Las Vegas round of the US D1 Grand Prix series in his RB26DETT-engined car. Foust would eventually take his 350Z to the Formula D title.

Open Road racing
Option magazine founder Daijiro Inada used an extensively modified 350Z, dubbed Option Stream Z, to compete in the Silver State Classic Challenge. The Option Stream Z appeared in the games Gran Turismo 4, Gran Turismo 5, and Gran Turismo (PSP).

Speed trials 

In 2004, the tuner Dandy and magazine Option entered a Z33 known as the "Option Dandy 380Z" with a donor engine from a salvaged Stream Z with a deleted turbo, producing , to compete in the F/GT class for naturally aspirated grand touring sport cars at the Bonneville Speed Week.

Advertising and promotions
This took place through the narrow cobblestone streets of Prague in the Czech Republic, and lasted six and a half minutes.

The 350Z has been extremely popular with diecast manufacturers, with companies such as Hot Wheels releasing various colors and styles of the car over the years.

The 350Z benefitted in popularity by making an appearance in The Fast and the Furious: Tokyo Drift, where it was fitted with a Veilside bodykit, amongst other modifications, and was driven by the fictional character "Drift King" Takashi.

Specifications

Sales by calendar year

Reception
The 350Z has been given extensive coverage in the automotive press, and has obtained generally positive reviews. Eddie Alterman, senior editor of Automobile magazine, said of the 350Z "An outstanding performance value. They got all the important stuff right." While David Swigg of Motor Trend said "With a competent driver at the wheel and the traction control switched off, many Boxster drivers would be hard-pressed to post better lap times than with this Z." Top Gear magazine later awarded the Nissan Designers with the 2004 Top Gear Magazine Car of the year award.

Automotive journalists tend to praise the 350Z's value, performance, handling, and braking. Criticisms tend to be directed towards the grade of interior plastics, greater curb weight than its competitors, cabin ergonomics and engine refinement. Other reviews have criticised reflections off the back strut in the rear window.

The 350Z has been recognized including the following:

Japanese Performance Car of the Year 2007 TopSpeed Magazine
10 Best Cars 2003 Car and Driver
Most Significant Vehicle of the Year. Two years running Edmunds.com
Editors' Most Wanted 2003 Edmunds.com
International Car of the Year: Most Sex Appeal Award 2003 Road and Travel
Canadian Car of the Year 2003 Automobile Journalists Association of Canada
Best New Design 2003 Automobile Journalists Association of Canada
Driver's Choice Best Performance Car 2003 MotorWeek
Winner 12 Best Cars Under 30K Road & Track
Car of the Year 2004 Top Gear Magazine
Automobile of the Year 2003 Automobile Magazine

In other media
Cover of Need for Speed: Underground 2, and the car owned by Rachel Teller in the game
Cover of Forza Motorsport 2 (and shared cover of Forza Motorsport)
Poster of The Fast and the Furious: Tokyo Drift
Car owned by Ana Rivera in Need For Speed Heat

Safety record
The 350Z came with front air bags in standard and supplemental side air bags and curtain air bags as an option. It won a NHTSA 5-star safety rating for front and side impact on the driver's side. With 143 deaths per million registrations, the two-door 350Z has been one of the least safe 2005–2008 model cars in the United States.

See also
 List of Nissan vehicles
 Nissan VQ engine
 Nissan Z-car

References

Notes

External links
Nissan Japan pages: 2002-2007 , 2007-2008 
Nissan 350Z Official US Site
Nissan 350Z Official UK Site
Nissan 350Z Official Australia Site

350Z
Sports cars
Coupés
Roadsters
Police vehicles
Rear-wheel-drive vehicles
Cars introduced in 2002